The 2008 Copa del Rey Juvenil was the 58th staging of the tournament. The competition began on May 18, 2008 and ended on June 28, 2008 with the final.

First round

|}

Quarterfinals

|}

Semifinals

|}

Final

Copa del Rey Juvenil de Fútbol
Juvenil